Church Road railway station was a railway station in Edgbaston, Birmingham, England, on the Midland Railway's Birmingham West Suburban Railway.

History

The station, which was located in a cutting at the mouth of a short tunnel, operated between 1876 and 1925, before closing due to lack of patronage. Although the line remains open, almost no trace now remains of the station.

On 7 July 1906 a passenger, Charles White, and his stepfather arrived at the station and purchased tickets for Birmingham New Street. As there was some time to wait for the train, they left the station and went into Carpenter Road. They were later observed on the southbound platform, and the elder man was struggling with Charles White, as if to restrain him from crossing the line. White broke free and jumped down into the adjacent tunnel. The station master, Mr Wilton heard the commotion and arrived on the platform, but unfortunately fell onto the track. As he lay there he witnessed Charles White being hit by a train. Although Charles White was not killed by the impact, he died in the ambulance on its way to Queen's Hospital, Birmingham.

Station masters

J. Clack 1876 - 1877
Charles Angell 1877 - 1880 (afterwards station master at Granville Street)
W.G. Stevenson 1880 - 1881
E. Morris 1881 - 1882
Oliver John Haddock 1882 - 1883 (afterwards station master at Edwalton)
W.J. Young 1883 - 1885
John Tye 1885 - 1887
Charles Roughton 1887 - 1898 (afterwards station master at Blackwell)
W.H. Baines 1898 - 1902 (afterwards station master at Brownhills, then Selly Oak)
T.E. Wilton 1902 - 1907

After 1907 the station was placed under the supervision of the station master of Five Ways

References

External links
Warwickshire Railways entry

Disused railway stations in Birmingham, West Midlands
Railway stations in Great Britain opened in 1876
Railway stations in Great Britain closed in 1925
Edgbaston
Former Midland Railway stations